Bodi, Ghana may refer to:

 Bodi (district)
 Bodi (Ghana parliament constituency)